Carmen Jedet Izquierdo Sánchez, known simply as Jedet (born July 7, 1992), is a Spanish actress, singer, internet celebrity and transgender LGBT activist.

Artistic career 
In 2016, Jedet started to be known as King Jedet, mostly on social media through her activism and her YouTube channel. At the same time she published her first book, Mi último Regalo. In an interview that same year, with WAG1 Magazine, Jedet confessed her intention to transition as a transgender woman.

In 2017, Jedet began her music career by releasing a collaboration with Ms Nina on the song "Reinas".

She began her television career in supporting roles in Looser and Paquita Salas. In 2020, Jedet got the leading role in the Antena 3 Veneno playing Cristina Ortiz. She recorded a version of "Veneno pa tu piel" as the main theme of the series. For this television role she received the 2020 Ondas Award in the category of Best Female Performer in National Fiction.

Private life 
Although her parents are Andalusian and she grew up in Polícar, she was born in Girona and lived there for several years during her youth, so she speaks fluent Catalan.  In particular, she was raised in l’Escala and attended primary and secondary school in Torroella de Montgrí.

Filmography

Awards

Discography 

 La leona (mixtape, 2018)

Publications

References 

Spanish LGBT rights activists
Spanish women singers
Spanish television actresses
Transgender actresses
Living people
1992 births
Spanish LGBT actors
Spanish LGBT singers
Spanish transgender people
Transgender women musicians
Transgender writers
Transgender singers